Universul was a mass-circulation newspaper in Romania. It existed from 1884 to 1953, and was run by Stelian Popescu from 1914 to 1943 (with a two-year break during World War I).

Newspapers published in Bucharest
Newspapers established in 1884
Publications disestablished in 1953
1953 disestablishments in Romania
Defunct newspapers published in Romania
Romanian-language newspapers